Esteghlal Shahrdari Rasht Football Club commonly known as Esteghlal Rasht, is a football club, based in Rasht, Gilan, Iran. The club was founded in 1983. First dissolved in 2002, the club was refounded later. The club plays currently in the Gilan Province League.

History

Establishment
The club was known as Esteghlal Gaz Rasht in 1992–93 Iran Football's 2nd Division due to sponsorship. After playing many years in Iran Football's 2nd Division, they were promoted to Azadegan League in 2000. They finished 10th in 2000–01 season. But only one year later they were relegated again. They finished 13th in that season.

Dissolution
Due to financial problems and relegation, Esteghlal Rasht sold their licence to Pegah Dairy Company. The new club was named as Pegah Gilan. Many players and their coach Majid Jahanpour moved to Pegah Gilan. On 5 August 2002, Esteghlal Rasht was officially dissolvedand it is known as Damashguilan sc

Refounding
However Esteghlal Rasht was refounded years later and able to play in Gilan Province League.

Stadium

Dr. Azodi Stadium is the home stadium of Esteghlal Rasht since 1990. It has a current capacity of 11,000 spectators. The stadium is named after Dr. Hassan Azodi who was killed on June 28, 1982, in an explosion at the central office of the Islamic Republican Party. It is also the home venue of local rivals Damash and Sepidrood.

Seasons
The table below chronicles the achievements of Esteghlal Rasht in various competitions since 1990.

Club managers
Majid Jahanpour (1990)
Farhad Kazemi (2000)
Majid Jahanpour (2000–2001)
Nasser Hejazi (2001–2002)
Majid Jahanpour (2002)

References

Association football clubs established in 1983
Association football clubs disestablished in 2002
Defunct football clubs in Iran
Sport in Gilan Province
1983 establishments in Iran
2002 disestablishments in Iran